Senecio eboracensis, the York groundsel or York radiate groundsel, is a flowering plant in the daisy family Asteraceae. It is a self-pollinating hybrid species of ragwort
and one of only six new plant species to be discovered in either the United Kingdom or North America in the last 100 years.  
It was discovered in 1979 in York, England growing next to a car park and formally described in 2003. Like many of the Senecio genus it can be found growing in urban habitats, such as disturbed earth and pavement cracks and this particular species only in York and between a railway and a car park.

Description
With pretty yellow daisy-like flowers from its Sicilian parent (S. squalidus) but also with the less-promiscuous habits of its native parent (S. vulgaris); this member of the Senecio genus is morphologically distinct from related species.

Leaves and stems
S. eboracensis have large many lobed leaves divided into slender segments, the clefts not reaching the midrib. The upper and lower leaves petiolate and lobes appearing at quarter whole leaf lengths along the midrib. The upper leaves are generally more deeply lobed and in lobed pairs. Leaves on plants grown in fertile soils or in greenhouses can be much more luxurious and more highly dissected (or more finely divided into slender segments) up to  x  with lobes appearing at fifth whole leaf lengths along the midrib. The plants tip is usually acute with a very small tooth. Leaf edges throughout are dentate or sometimes divided into lobes.

Flowers
York groundsel has flower-heads that are more showy than those of its parent groundsel. The flower-head, found at the tips of the plants (apical) appearing in clusters (an inflorescence) usually consists of three to seven florets in a grouped corymb; at first dense and leafy but eventually less dense with peduncles 5 to 20 millimeters (0.2 to 0.8 in) which get longer when fruiting (up to 25 mm (1 in)).  The flower-head is broadly cylindrical 10×4 millimeters (0.4×0.16 in), becoming slightly bell shaped) when the bright yellow ray florets open.  Involucral bracts sparse (4-8), elongated (3.5–4 mm), usually without black tips.  The floret ligules are narrow and long 5 to 7 millimeters (0.2 to 0.24 in) long and 1.5 millimeters (0.06 in) wide), occasionally becoming revolute.  Like other Senecios, the 10-30 papilla occur stigmatically into pericarp; each usually with four-pored pollen, the grains in polar view 30-35 micrometers when fully expanded.

Seeds
The achenes can be 2.5 to 3.5 millimeters (0.1 to 0.15 in) long, are straight and shallowly grooved; with hairless smooth ribs while the grooves are covered with hairs.  The silky white, umbrella-like pappus readily detaches from the fruit when ripe.

Name
The word Eboracum, the classical name of York, was chosen in the year 2000 to describe this tetraploid hybrid derivative informally named 'York radiate groundsel' at the time a formal description was made.

Distribution
York groundsel occurs on disturbed ground, car park perimeters, pavement cracks and other urban/industrial sites; specifically in disturbed areas near to the railways in York, England.

One of the parents Senecio vulgaris is a native to the area 
while the other parent Senecio squalidus was introduced from Mount Etna in Sicily in 1690 to the Oxford Botanic Garden in Oxford, England and was soon spreading happily along the railways and throughout the country.

Evolution
Senecio eboracensis is a hybrid species whose parents are the self-incompatible and promiscuous Sicilian Senecio squalidus (also known as Oxford ragwort) and the self-compatible and tenacious Senecio vulgaris (also known as Common groundsel). Like S. vulgaris, S. eboracensis is self-compatible but shows little or no natural crossing with its parent species and is therefore reproductively isolated, indicating that strong breeding barriers exist between this new hybrid and its parents.
It is thought to have resulted from backcrossing of the F1 hybrid of its parents to S. vulgaris. S. vulgaris is native to Britain, while S. squalidus was introduced from Sicily in the early 18th century; therefore, S. eboracensis has speciated from those two species within the last 300 years.

Other hybrids descended from the same two parents are known. Some are infertile, such as S. x baxteri. Other fertile hybrids are also known, including S. vulgaris var. hibernicus (which has been accepted as a synonym for S. vulgaris), 
now common in Britain, and the allohexaploid S. cambrensis, which according to molecular evidence probably originated independently at least three times in different locations. 
Morphological and genetic evidence support the status of S. eboracensis as separate from other known hybrids.

See also
Common Cordgrass
Welsh groundsel
Tragopogon miscellus
Tragopogon mirus
Raphanus sativus x  Brassica rapa

References

External links

Further reading

eboracensis
Flora of Great Britain
Plants described in 2003
Speciation events